The Sunshine Coast Line is the current marketing name of what originally was the Tendring Hundred Railway Line, a branch off the Great Eastern Main Line in the East of England. The line is part of the Network Rail Strategic Route 7, SRS 07.08, and is classified as a London & South East commuter line. Passenger services on the line are currently operated by Greater Anglia.

There are, however, limited morning and evening peak-time services in each direction between Walton-on-the-Naze and Liverpool Street.

History

Steam era

By the time the Wivenhoe extension opened the line had been taken over by the Great Eastern Railway (GER) who provided the rolling-stock in return for 50% of takings.

In the meantime, a short branch to a new station called St. Botolph's, located more centrally in Colchester, opened on 1 March 1866. This station was renamed Colchester Town on 8 July 1991 by British Rail.

There were also proposals to build a line to Clacton as early as 1866, but nothing came of them until 1877, when the Clacton-on-Sea Railway was incorporated.

The GER negotiated to buy both the Tendring Hundred Railway and the Clacton-on-Sea Railway, and they became part of the GER on 1 July 1883.  The Wivenhoe & Brightlingsea company was absorbed by the GER on 9 June 1893.

In 1923 the line (along with the rest of the GER) became part of the London and North Eastern Railway.

A section of the line between Frinton and Walton-on-Naze had to be re-sited in 1929 due to fears of coastal erosion on the original alignment.

Following nationalisation on 1 January 1948, the line became part of the Eastern Region of British Railways.

Electrification

The first trial train to run on the newly electrified section departed Colchester on 18 January 1959. The line was the first in the country to be electrified at 25 kV AC, using overhead wires, with electrified services inaugurated on 13 April 1959. Between 1962 and 1992, services on the line were largely operated by a fleet of  electric multiple units which were specially designed and constructed for the route. The 309s were replaced on the route by newer rolling stock between 1992 and 1994 during the Network SouthEast era.

Passenger services have been operated by two different franchises since privatisation of British Rail in 1997: First Great Eastern until 31 March 2004, when National Express took over with the company branded as One until February 2008, at which time it was rebranded as National Express East Anglia. It is currently operated by Abellio Greater Anglia.

Recent developments

A £104 million engineering project known as the Colchester to Clacton Resignalling Project took place on the line between December 2006 and July 2009. Life-expired signalling equipment was replaced and a new control system was installed; 170 modern LED signals were installed and eight manual level crossings were upgraded to full barrier crossings with security cameras. The line was closed every weekend and on public holidays, with bus replacement services provided.

There was opposition from the town of Frinton to keep the manual gates, which were reportedly removed "under cover of darkness". Folklore has it that townspeople used to lock the gates to keep out coach-loads of tourists.

Infrastructure 
The Engineer's Line Reference for the line from Colchester Junction to Clacton is COC, and from Thorpe-le-Soken Junction to Walton-on-the-Naze is TWN.

Passenger train services are operated by electric multiple units, typically  and Class 720 units. The Walton-on-the-Naze to Colchester local services are typically formed of four carriages. The Clacton-on-Sea to London Liverpool Street services are usually operated by Class 720 units and formed of ten carriages, though occasionally formed of eight or twelve carriages when Class 321 units are used.

Stations 

Services

The typical Monday to Saturday off-peak service on the line is:

1 train per hour (tph) between Clacton-on-Sea and London Liverpool Street, calling at Thorpe-le-Soken, Wivenhoe, Colchester, Witham, Chelmsford, Ingatestone, Shenfield, Stratford and London Liverpool Street
1 tph between Walton-on-the-Naze and Colchester, calling at Frinton-on-Sea, Kirby Cross, Thorpe-le-Soken, Weeley, Great Bentley, Alresford, Wivenhoe, Hythe, Colchester Town and Colchester
1 tph between Colchester and Colchester Town

References 

Rail transport in Essex
Railway lines in the East of England
Standard gauge railways in England